Fauna of Poland, according to the Polish Museum and Institute of Zoology, includes approximately 36,000 species. The most common type of fauna in Poland are arthropods (Arthropoda), and within the phyla, insects (Insecta) are most numerous.

Polish fauna is represented by vertebrates including but not limited to:
 ray-finned fishes (Actinopterygii) – 129 species (35 species are believed to be non-indigenous) 
 amphibians (Amphibia) – 18 species
 reptiles (Reptilia) – 9 species
 birds (Aves) – 435 species
 mammals (Mammalia) – 105 species

See also
 List of birds of Poland
 List of Lepidoptera of Poland
 List of mammals of Poland
 List of non-marine molluscs of Poland
 List of reptiles of Poland

References